Peroxisomal acyl-coenzyme A oxidase 3 is an enzyme that in humans is encoded by the ACOX3 gene.

Acyl-Coenzyme A oxidase 3 also known as pristanoyl-CoA oxidase (ACOX3) is involved in the desaturation of 2-methyl branched fatty acids in peroxisomes. Unlike the rat homolog, the human gene is expressed in very low amounts in the liver such that its mRNA was undetectable by routine Northern-blot analysis, by immunoblotting for its product, or by enzyme activity measurements. However the human cDNA encoding a 700 amino acid protein with a peroxisomal targeting C-terminal tripeptide S-K-L was isolated and is thought to be expressed under special conditions such as specific developmental stages or in a tissue specific manner in tissues that have not yet been examined.

See also
 ACOX1
 Acyl-CoA oxidase

References

Further reading

External links
 

Human proteins